Bad Robots is a British television prank show that originally aired on E4 from November 2014. Made by Objective Productions, the show centres on a fleet of seemingly defective and even mischievous machines, devices and robots produced by the fictional TezCorp Industries. Unsuspecting members of the public were filmed using these everyday machines, resulting in practical-joke and hidden-camera laughs.
 
Bad Robots was commissioned for Comedy Blaps (Channel 4's vehicle for piloting comedy) in late 2013. The pilot was written and performed by Lee Kern, who played a prototype version of the show's primary robot, "BOT". The show was subsequently commissioned for a full series of 6 episodes, to air on E4.

The series was created by Nathan Eastwood, directed by Paul Routledge, and written and produced by Ben Spiteri. Lee Kern wrote the sequences featuring "BOT". Motion graphics for the series were created by Compost Creative. A host of comedy talent provided voices for the machines, including Lee Kern as "BOT", Michael Gambon, Simon Greenall, Rob Delaney, Terry Mynott, Diane Morgan and Tom Allen.

The first episode drew an average audience figure of 338,000.

Transmissions

List of Machines

References

External links 
 
 

2010s British comedy television series
2014 British television series debuts
2015 British television series endings
E4 comedy
English-language television shows
Hidden camera television series